SPARKcon is an annual creative festival located in downtown Raleigh, North Carolina, held each September. It is best known as a citywide showcase of local creative talent. SPARKcon was started in 2006 by members of Designbox, including Aly and Beth Khalifa (of Gamil Design), and Paul Friedrich. In 2009, it was estimated that more than 30,000 people attended the 4-day festival, which showcased 1,200 performers.

External links
 SPARKcon website

Festivals in North Carolina
Tourist attractions in Raleigh, North Carolina
Festivals established in 2006
Events in Raleigh, North Carolina
2006 establishments in North Carolina
Art festivals in the United States